Andrei Sergeyevich Fetisov (alternate spelling: Andrey) (born 19 January 1972) is a Russian former professional basketball player.

Professional career
Fetisov was a second round pick of the NBA's Boston Celtics, in the 1994 NBA draft, at which time he was playing for the Spanish club Forum Valladolid. After the draft, his draft rights were traded to the Milwaukee Bucks.

He was a member of the FIBA European Selection team, in 1995.

National team career
Fetisov was a member of the senior Russian national basketball team. With Russia, he won a silver medal at the 1993 EuroBasket, a silver medal at the 1994 FIBA World Championship, and a bronze medal at the 1997 EuroBasket. He also played at the 1995 EuroBasket, and the 2000 Summer Olympic Games.

References

External links
Euroleague.net Profile
FIBA Profile
FIBA Europe Profile
Eurobasket.com Profile
Spanish League Profile 
Italian League Profile 

1972 births
Living people
Basketball players at the 2000 Summer Olympics
BC Avtodor Saratov players
BC Dynamo Moscow players
BC Spartak Primorye players
BC UNICS players
Boston Celtics draft picks
CB Valladolid players
FC Barcelona Bàsquet players
Liga ACB players
Olympic basketball players of Russia
PBC CSKA Moscow players
PBC Lokomotiv-Kuban players
Power forwards (basketball)
Russian expatriate basketball people in Spain
Russian men's basketball players
1994 FIBA World Championship players
People from Novokuznetsk
Sportspeople from Kemerovo Oblast